Laura Ann Waller is a computer scientist and Ted Van Duzer Endowed Associate Professor at the University of California, Berkeley. She was awarded a Chan Zuckerberg Initiative Fellowship to develop microscopes to image deep structures within the brain in 2017 and won the 2018 SPIE Early Career Award.

Early life and education 
Waller is from Kingston, Ontario. She studied at Massachusetts Institute of Technology. She earned her bachelor's degree in Electronic Engineering and Computer Science in 2004 and her Masters in 2005. During her undergraduate study she spent a year at the University of Cambridge as part of the Cambridge–MIT Institute. Her Masters thesis considered the design of feedback loops and experimental testing techniques for integrated optics. In 2010 she completed her doctoral studies under the supervision of George Barbastathis where her thesis investigated developed new techniques to image phase and amplitude. She was a Singapore-MIT Alliance for Research and Technology (SMART) student. She played on the MIT Women's Varsity soccer team and was president of The Optical Society student chapter.

Career and research
Waller works on computational imaging. She joined Princeton University in 2010, where she worked as a research associate and lecturer. She joined University of California, Berkeley in 2012. Her research group focus on phase imaging, super-resolution microscopy and lensless imaging. She is a senior fellow of the Berkeley Institute for Data Science.

Waller was named as one of the David and Lucile Packard Foundation Fellow in 2014. That year she was also awarded a Gordon and Betty Moore Foundation Data-Driven Discovery Investigator. She is a National Science Foundation CAREER Award holder, allowing her research group to build computational and experimental software for imaging 4D partially spatially coherent light. She has developed machine learning techniques for 3D microscopy. She was awarded tenure at University of California, Berkeley in 2016. In 2017 Waller was awarded an investigator award from the Chan Zuckerberg Initiative. Waller was awarded the SPIE Early Career Achievement Award in Academia in January 2018. Through the development of hardware for computational imaging, Waller has made several contributions to biomedical and industrial sciences. Her group develop open source software for imaging. She was one of the MIT EECS Rising Stars for 2018.

Awards and honors 

2019 Fellow of The Optical Society
2018 SPIE Early Career Achievement Award in Academia
2016 Carol D. Soc Distinguished Graduate Student Mentoring Award for Junior Faculty
2016 Best Paper Award, International Conference on Computational Photography
2012 The Optical Society Ivan P. Kaminow Outstanding Early Career Professional Prize 
2021 The Optical Society of America Adolph Lomb Medal for important contributions to the advancement of computational microscopy and its applications

References 

Canadian emigrants to the United States
MIT School of Engineering alumni
UC Berkeley College of Engineering faculty
American women computer scientists
American computer scientists
Computer engineers
Living people
Fellows of Optica (society)
Women in optics
People from Kingston, Ontario
Year of birth missing (living people)
21st-century American women